Banana Cabbage, Potato Lettuce, Onion Orange is the debut album of David Grubbs, released on March 14, 1997, through Table of the Elements.

Track listing

Personnel 
Bundy K. Brown – engineering
David Grubbs – guitar
Jim O'Rourke – production, engineering, recording
Dan Osborn – cover art, design

References 

1997 debut albums
David Grubbs albums